Jawahar Navodaya Vidyalaya known as JNV are Indian schools for talented children and form a part of the system of gifted education. Its target group are talented rural children, aiming to provide them with an education comparable to the best in a residential school system, without regard to their family's Social economy condition.

Jawahar Navodaya Vidyalaya is a fully residential, co-educational school affiliated to the CBSE, New Delhi and has classes from VI to XII standard. The Vidyalaya is run by Navodaya Vidyalaya Samiti, New Delhi, an autonomous organization under the Department of Education and Literacy, Ministry of HRD., government of India.

Objectives 
To provide education to talented children from the rural areas, without regard to their family’s socio-economic condition.
To ensure that all the students attain a competency in three languages.
To, serve in each district, as a focal point for improvement in quality of school education through sharing of experience and facilities.
To organize games and sports, co-curricular activity, and outdoor activities.

Facilities
Free board and lodging.
Free education.
Free books, stationery, uniforms and daily use items.
Science and commerce streams at +1 and +2 levels.
Laboratories for Physics, Chemistry and Biology.
Computer lab. with 36 PCs, LCD projector and LAN with broad band internet facilities through V-SAT.
Library with books, periodicals and newspapers.
Playground with facilities for games and sports.
M.I. room to provide first aid to sick students.
Mess with a dining hall to cater over 500 students.
Power back up facilities to hostels through generator.

References and external links
 NVS official website
 All India Navodaya Alumni Association official Website
 JNV Mainpuri official website

Jawahar Navodaya Vidyalayas in Uttar Pradesh
Boarding schools in Uttar Pradesh
High schools and secondary schools in Uttar Pradesh
Mainpuri district
Educational institutions established in 1992
1992 establishments in Uttar Pradesh